A Bride for a Ride is a 2009 Hong Kong television series based on the traditional Pingtan story of the same name. Set during the prosperous Ming dynasty of China, the drama revolves around the rich and influential Wong family and their comedic ties with Chow Man-bun, a young and handsome scholar who has a specialty in cross-dressing. To prove his worth to Wong Sau-ying, his ideal lover, he cross dresses as a beauty in a lantern festival so he can get closer to her. Sau-ying's older brother, Tiger Wong, sees Man-bun's beauty and kidnaps him home. A Bride for a Ride consists of elements of Cantonese opera. Chin Kar-lok, who stars as Tiger Wong, is also the drama's action choreographer.

Synopsis
Foolhardy Tiger Wong (Chin) is annoyed with his mother (Wong) for consistently pressuring him to get married. He therefore snatches Chow Man-bun (Chan) who is in female disguise to be his bride and arranges for Man-bun to stay at his younger sister Sau-ying's (Wu) chamber for the night. After this, Tiger has no choice but to marry Sau-ying to Man-bun while setting up strict rules to torture Man-bun in the house. Clever Man-bun makes use of the chivalrous woman Mo Sam-leung (So) to control Tiger and misleads Sam-leung that Tiger is her long lost rescuer. Using tricks to upset Tiger, he makes Tiger marry Sam-leung. Since then, Sam-leung tries every means to domesticate her husband and that almost drives him insane. Man-bun is relieved to escape Tiger's manipulation but he carelessly causes much trouble elsewhere. A Bride for A Ride brings you a modern perspective of this traditional tale and you'll surely be surprised with its astonishing approach.

Cast
 Note: Some of the characters' names are in Cantonese romanisation.

Chin Kar-lok as Tiger Wong
Sammul Chan as Chow Man-bun
Louisa So as Mo Sam-leung
Joseph Lee as Chuk Chi-shan
Nancy Wu as Wong Sau-ying
Rain Lau as Wong Kwai-fei
Gigi Wong as Lau Bing-tai
Mimi Chu as Sheung Ping
Cheung Kwok-keung as Lau Gan
Nicky Law as Ching-tak Emperor
Catherine Chau as So-kam
Chun Wong as Magistrate Bei Mat
Natalie Wong as Lee Fung
Deno Cheung as Lee Lung
Macy Chan as Sze Mung-lo
Wong Man Piu as the Prince of Ning

Viewership ratings
The following is a table that includes a list of the total ratings points based on television viewership. "Viewers in millions" refers to the number of people, derived from TVB Jade ratings (not including TVB HD Jade), in Hong Kong who watched the episode live. The peak number of viewers are in brackets.

Awards and nominations
TVB Anniversary Awards (2009)
Best Drama
Best Actor (Chin Kar Lok)
My Favourite Male Character (Chin Kar Lok)

References

External links
TVB.com A Bride for a Ride - Official Website 

TVB dramas
Television series set in the Ming dynasty
2009 Hong Kong television series debuts
2009 Hong Kong television series endings
Television series set in the 16th century